Liberty Township is an inactive township in Knox County, in the U.S. state of Missouri.

Liberty Township was established in 1872, and named for the American principle of liberty.

References

Townships in Missouri
Townships in Knox County, Missouri